IPR may refer to:

Law
Intellectual property rights
Inter partes review, US procedure for challenging patents

Media
Independent Public Radio network, Minnesota, US
Indie Press Revolution, a sales network for role-playing games
WBST (Indiana Public Radio), a public radio network in east central Indiana
Interlochen Public Radio, Michigan, United States
Iowa Public Radio, US

Organisations
Institute for Plasma Research, India
Institute of Pacific Relations (1925–1960)
Institute for Policy Research and Catholic Studies, Washington, DC
Mikael Ter-Mikaelian Institute for Physical Research, Armenia
Prague Institute of Planning and Development, Czech Republic

Science and mathematics
 Indirect potable reuse of reclaimed water
Interproximal reduction, an orthodontic treatment
 Inverse Participation Ratio, measure of localization or purity of a quantum mechanical state

Chemistry
i-Pr or iPr, abbreviations for the isopropyl group in organic chemistry
IPr, an N-heterocyclic carbene, see IMes

Others
Indicação de Proveniência Regulamentada (Indication of Regulated Origin), Portuguese wine designation